Ignazio Carta (born 18 May 1991) is an Italian football defender.

Club career
On 29 January 2019, he joined Serie D club Sangiustese.

On 2 August 2019, he signed with Carpi.

Domestic League Records

References

External links

1991 births
Sportspeople from Cagliari
Footballers from Sardinia
Living people
Italian footballers
Italy youth international footballers
Association football defenders
Latina Calcio 1932 players
Savona F.B.C. players
Vis Pesaro dal 1898 players
A.C. Carpi players
Serie C players
Serie D players
A.C. Sangiustese players